is a railway station on the Iida Line in the city of Ina, Nagano Prefecture, Japan, operated by Central Japan Railway Company (JR Central).

Lines
Inakita Station is served by the Iida Line and is 178.9 kilometers from the starting point of the line at Toyohashi Station.

Station layout
The station consists of one ground-level side platform and one island platform connected by a level crossing. The station is unattended.

Platforms

Adjacent stations

History
Inakita Station opened on 4 January 1912. With the privatization of Japanese National Railways (JNR) on 1 April 1987, the station came under the control of JR Central. The current station building was completed in 1991.

Passenger statistics
In fiscal 2015, the station was used by an average of 1012 passengers daily (boarding passengers only).

Surrounding area
Ina Kita High School
Ina Chuo Hospital

See also
 List of railway stations in Japan

References

External links

 Inakita Station information 

Railway stations in Nagano Prefecture
Railway stations in Japan opened in 1912
Stations of Central Japan Railway Company
Iida Line
Ina, Nagano